Epsilon Pyxidis (ε Pyxidis) is quadruple star system in the southern constellation of Pyxis. It is faintly visible to the naked eye, having a combined apparent visual magnitude of +5.60. Based upon an annual parallax shift of 15.39 mas as seen from Earth, it is located around 212 light years from the Sun. The system is deemed to be a member of the Sirius supercluster of stars that share a common motion through space.

The primary, component A, is a white-hued A-type subgiant star with a stellar classification of A4 IV. It is a microvariable, showing a 0.0056 change in magnitude with a frequency of 0.16245 times per day. Epsilon Pyxidis has been catalogued as an Am star, although this remains uncertain. It has double the mass of the Sun and radiates 19 times the Sun's luminosity from its photosphere at an effective temperature of 6,368 K.

In addition to a close companion of unknown type at an angular separation of 0.17 arc seconds, the primary shares an orbit with a binary star system, components B and C, that lie at an angular separation of 17.8 arc seconds. At the estimated distance of this system, this corresponds to a projected separation of around 1,150 AU. The B/C pair consist of visual magnitude 10.5 and 10.8 stars with a mean separation of 0.3 arc seconds. They have estimated mass of 90% and 95% that of the Sun, respectively.

References

A-type subgiants
4
Pyxidis, Epsilon
Pyxis (constellation)
Durchmusterung objects
078922
045001
3644